In Legal Latin, the phrase praeter legem ("outside of the law") "refers to an item that is not regulated by law and therefore is not illegal".  It is thus distinct from the phrase contra legem, which refers to something that is directly against the law and therefore illegal, or in conflict with statutes or other written regulation without being illegal or invalid, and may also be compared to intra legem, "within the law" (legal).

Items that are generally labeled praeter legem include certain customs.

References

Latin legal terminology